Spiraea japonica var. alpina, also known as the alpine spirea or daphne spirea, is a low-growing, rounded, deciduous shrub which has pink flowers in flat-topped clusters in late spring to mid summer. The leaves are small, oval, sharply toothed and blue green colored. In the fall they turn red and orange. 

They are native to Japan but grow in USDA hardiness zones 4 through 8.

References

japonica var. alpina